KIMX (104.5 FM , iMix 104.5) is a radio station licensed to Centennial, Wyoming, United States. The station is currently owned by White Park Broadcasting.
If the station goes on air from its originally licensed location, it will be broadcasting from a tower within Centennial. If the construction permit is built, the station will be broadcasting from the site of sister station on Pilot Hill, east of Laramie.

References

External links

IMX
Contemporary hit radio stations in the United States
Radio stations established in 2013
2013 establishments in Wyoming